Brugg railway station could refer to:

 Brugg AG railway station in Brugg, Aargau, Switzerland
 Brügg BE railway station in Brügg, Bern, Switzerland

See also
 Brig railway station
 Brugge railway station